Octavian Morosan (born June 30, 1987) better known by his online username Kripparrian, is a Romanian-Canadian Twitch streamer, YouTuber and video game personality. He is known for his achievements on Diablo III, World of Warcraft and Hearthstone, winning the "Favorite Hearthstone Stream" and Most "Engaged" Viewers categories, and coming second in the "Highest Stream View Average" category at the Blizzard Stream Awards in 2014. In June 2017 he achieved over one million followers on Twitch and as of July 2021, he has over 1.4 million followers.

Achievements

World of Warcraft
Kripparrian was a World of Warcraft player before beginning his streaming career, recognized for being the first person to complete the Ironman Challenge, being in a leading US raiding guild, Exodus, as well as being a competitor of top Hunter DPS parses during that time. In mid-2010, Kripparrian had the highest damage per second benchmarks for the Hunter class in the game.

Diablo III 
Kripparrian completed the Diablo III video game at "Inferno" difficulty (the highest in the game at that time) with his friend Krippi, just over a month after it was launched. The achievement was done before patch 1.0.3, which made the game easier, and both players used "Hardcore" characters in the feat, which are lost forever when the characters are killed in the game.

Hearthstone 
Kripparrian is the second most popular Hearthstone streamer of all time. He competed in the Innkeeper's Invitational Hearthstone tournament at BlizzCon 2013. He has also achieved "Legend rank", the highest ranking in the game's ladder system, which he reached in August 2015. However, Kripparrian is more known as an Arena, and more recently, Battlegrounds, player, where he is able to achieve high victory streaks despite having drafted poor cards. He is noted for his fun and innovative Hearthstone decks and spearheaded efforts, along with his wife, Rania, towards making Challengestone, a Hearthstone deckbuilding competition. GamesRadar listed Kripparrian's Twitch channel as one players should watch.

Kripparrian, AmazHS, and Frodan commentated the Hearthstone World Championship at Blizzcon 2015.

His streams get around 50,512 viewers on average. In January 2017 and September 2018, he achieved the first place in the first monthly "Top 100" leaderboard for North America players in the "Arena" game mode.

Personal life
Before his streaming career, Kripparrian worked as a computer technician after dropping out of college, where he was studying physics and mathematics.

He is married to Rania Chatzi Morosan (underflowR), who is also his manager and the editor of his YouTube videos, as well as maintains a YouTube channel with clips from their real life. They were married on October 31, 2014.

He lived in Athens, Greece for a year and a half with his wife. They currently reside in Canada, in a house they designed and built themselves. They have two dogs, a German Shepherd named Dexter and a Corgi named Fey.

He is a vegan.

References

External links 
 
 

1987 births
Living people
World of Warcraft players
Hearthstone players
Canadian esports players
Canadian people of Romanian descent
Sportspeople from Suceava
Sportspeople from Toronto
Team SoloMid players
Twitch (service) streamers
YouTube channels launched in 2009
Canadian YouTubers